Danielle Brown (born 1988) is a British archer.

Danielle Brown may also refer to:

Sports
Danielle Brown (dancer) (born 1980s), American ballet dancer
Danielle Brown (athlete) in 2008 NACAC U23 Championships in Athletics
Danielle Brown (tennis) in 2009 ITF Women's Circuit

Others
Danielle Brown on List of former Emmerdale characters
Danielle Brown, pseudonym of Dan Brown
Danielle Michelle Brown, American television personality better known as Diem Brown